Airport is a metro station on the Orange Line of the Nagpur Metro serving the Sonegaon area of Nagpur. It was opened to the public on 8 March 2019.

Station Layout

References 

Nagpur Metro stations
Railway stations in India opened in 2019